Tatsuo Sato is the name of:

, Japanese politician of the Liberal Democratic Party
, Japanese anime director